The Six of Us is a 1982 television film directed by Edward Parone and starring Gail Strickland and Marco St. John. It eventually served as a pilot film for the short-lived television series The Family Tree. The 1983 series was recast (except for the deaf actor Jonathan Hall Kovacs), and some characters' names were changed.

Premise
A divorced woman with children marries a divorced man with children and consequently they must find a way to get along.

Cast
 Gail Strickland as Sally Benjamin-Tree  
 Marco St. John as Kevin Tree
 Susan Swift as Tessa Benjamin  
 Lee Montgomery as Sam Benjamin  
 Jonathan Hall Kovacs as Toby Benjamin  
 Patrick Cassidy as Jake Tree    
 Phillip R. Allen as Robert Benjamin

External links
 

NBC network original films
American drama films
Television films as pilots
1982 television films
1982 films
1982 drama films
1980s English-language films
1980s American films